On 17 August 2005, around 500 bomb explosions occurred at 300 locations in 63 out of the 64 districts of Bangladesh. The bombs exploded within a half-hour period starting from 11:30 am. A terrorist organization, Jama'atul Mujahideen Bangladesh (JMB) claimed responsibility for the bombings. The group, led by Shaykh Abdur Rahman and Siddiqur Rahman (also known as Bangla Bhai). Another terrorist group, named Harkat-ul-Jihad al-Islami, was associated with JMB in executing the co-ordinated attack. Following the bombings, both groups were banned by the BNP Government of Bangladesh.

Attacks
The bomb exploded near Government facilities. In Dhaka, they exploded near Bangladesh Secretariat, the Supreme Court Complex, the Prime Minister's Office, the Dhaka University campus, the Dhaka Sheraton Hotel and Zia International Airport. At least 115 people were injured when 500 small bombs were exploded in 63 out of 64 districts of Bangladesh. The explosion killed two people (a child in Savar, near Dhaka, and a rickshaw-puller in Chapai Nawabganj District), and injured a further 50.

Victims
Rickshaw driver Rabiul Islam was injured when seven bombs exploded at about 11:10am at Biswa Road crossing near Shah Neamatullah College in the Nawabganj. He died on way to Rajshahi Medical College Hospital.
Schoolboy Abdus Salam, who was 10 was injured when bomb exploded outside his house in Savar. He died in the hospital.

Trials
The main perpetrators of the bombing, Bangla Bhai and Shaykh Abdur Rahman, were captured by the Rapid Action Battalion in early March 2006 during the BNP led government. They were convicted of murder and terrorism charges, along with four other militants, and were executed by hanging on 30 March 2007. Five suspects were sentenced to death and one to 20 years in prison for their part in the bomb attacks in Bogra. By 2013, 200 cases out of 273 cases filed in connection with 2005 Bangladesh bombings have been disposed of. Different courts have sentenced 58 people to death and  150 were sentenced to life in prison and 300 others were sentenced to various terms in prisons.

Reactions
Motiur Rahman Nizami, the then industry minister, from Jamaat-e-Islami blamed India for the blast.
 Moudud Ahmed, the then law minister, from Bangladesh Nationalist Party said "If they try for 100 years, they will not turn Bangladesh into a Taliban state,".
The then chief cleric Ubaidul Haq remarked to thousands of worshippers at Baitul Mukarram Mosque, "Islam prohibits suicide bombings. These bombers are enemies of Islam. It is a duty for all Muslims to stand up against those who are killing people in the name of Islam."

See also 

 List of attacks on high courts

References

2000s in Dhaka
2005 murders in Bangladesh
2000s trials
Attacks on buildings and structures in Bangladesh
Attacks on government buildings and structures
Attacks on hotels in Asia
Hotel bombings
Attacks on universities and colleges
Crime in Dhaka
Explosions in Dhaka
Improvised explosive device bombings in 2005
Improvised explosive device bombings in Bangladesh
Islamic terrorism in Bangladesh
Islamic terrorist incidents in 2005
Terrorist incidents in Bangladesh in 2005
Trials in Bangladesh
Building bombings in Bangladesh
August 2005 events in Bangladesh